Lisdoonvarna is a spa town in County Clare in Ireland. The town is famous for its music and festivals. Although the music festival was discontinued in the 1980s, Lisdoonvarna still hosts its annual matchmaking festival each September. The population was 829 at the 2016 Census.

Geography
Lisdoonvarna is located in the area of County Clare known as the Burren, on the N67 road between Ballyvaughan and Ennistymon. The Aille River flows through the town, where it is joined by the Gowlaun and Kilmoon streams.

The town is in the civil parish of Kilmoon.  Nearby townlands in this parish include Ballyinsheen Beg, Ballyinsheen More, Rathbaun and Rooska.

Name
The town takes its name from the Irish Lios Dúin Bhearna meaning the "lios dúin", or enclosured fort, of the gap (bearna). It is believed that the fort referred to in this name is the green earthen fort of Lissateeaun ("fort of the fairy hill"), which lies 3 km to the northeast of the town, near the remains of a Norman-era castle.

History

The present town is a comparatively new one by Irish standards, dating mainly from the start of the 19th century.

The spa official opened in 1845, but the town was visited before by people partaking of the waters. Even by the 1880s, however, the facilities were quite primitive. The wells were privately owned by the Guthrie family and were later developed and baths built by the new owner, a Dr. Westropp, who lived in a house overlooking the spa.

On 11 September 1887, the house of landowner Mike Walsh was attacked by "moonlighters" (members of one of the organized bands of desperados that carried on a system of agrarian outrages in Ireland). A detachment of the Royal Irish Constabulary (RIC) defended the house and its owner, and there was heavy fighting in and around the house. Head Constable Whelehan was killed. All the moonlighters were captured. Seven constables, four acting constables and two head constables received the Constabulary Medal for valour.

The spa prospered into the 20th century. In 1920, it was called the "Homberg of the Irish priests".

The area was officially classified as part of the West Clare Gaeltacht, an Irish-speaking community, until 1956.

Historical maps of Lisdoonvarna show how the Main Street looked in the nineteenth century. It also gives the location of the RIC barracks and the many hotels associated with the town, such as Queen's Hotel and Eagle Hotel, amongst others.

Arts and culture

Events

In September each year one of Europe's largest matchmaking events is held in the town attracting upwards of 40,000 romantic hopefuls, bachelor farmers and accompanying revellers. The month-long event is an important tourist attraction. The current matchmaker is Willie Daly, a fourth-generation matchmaker.

A now-defunct music festival which took place near the town is celebrated in a song of the same name written by the Irish folk singer Christy Moore. This festival took place until 1983, when the last event was marred by a riot and the accidental drowning of eight people.

Infrastructure

Spa
The spa originally consisted of four wells. Copperas Well, on Kilmoon stream, is now closed. It was used externally for skin conditions, ulcers and sores. The Magnesia and Iron Well remains open in season. The Twin Wells offer water rich in iron and sulphur. The main Sulphur Well lies at the bottom of the hill. All the waters contain iodine.

The spa park is located at the confluence of the Aille and Gowlaun rivers. The spa complex features a Victorian pump house among other amenities.

Transport
Bus Éireann route 350 links Lisdoonvarna to several locations: Ennis, Ennistymon, Cliffs of Moher, Doolin, Fanore, Kinvara and Galway. There are a number of journeys each way daily. Onward rail and bus connections are available at Ennis and Galway.

Spectacle Bridge, spanning the Aille river, dates from 1850.

See also
 List of towns and villages in Ireland

References and notes

External links

BBC World Service documentary about the matchmaking festival
 Lisdoonvarna at the Clare County Library

Towns and villages in County Clare